Bill Grant may refer to:

 Bill Grant (curler) (1882–1942), Canadian curler
 Bill Grant (Australian footballer) (1882–1947), Australian rules footballer
 Bill Grant (Gaelic footballer) (1891–1955), Irish Gaelic footballer
 Bill Grant (mandolinist) (born 1930), American bluegrass musician
 Bill Grant (politician) (born 1951), British Conservative MP for Ayr, Carrick and Cumnock
 James W. Grant (born 1943), American banker and politician from Florida

See also
 William Grant (disambiguation)